George Pechell Mends (baptized 10 May 181515 September 1871) was an English sailor and amateur artist.

He joined the Royal Navy in 1824, first serving on his father's ship. After ten years, he became an officer and served on several other ships. When the latter was paid off in 1866, he retired as a captain on half-pay. Throughout his service on naval stations all over the world, he painted watercolours which typically showed ships and nautical landscapes.

Early life 
George Pechell Mends was baptized on 10 May 1815 at St Budeaux, Plymouth, Devon, England. He was born into a notable Pembrokeshire naval family. His father was Vice Admiral William Bowen Mends, whose brother, George's uncle, was Commodore Sir Robert Mends (c. 1767–1823). His own elder brother was Admiral Sir William Robert Mends  (27 February 1812 – 26 June 1897), and a younger brother was to become a captain in the Royal Navy. He was the first child to go to sea. Mends grew up in Haverfordwest. He formally entered the Navy on 9 February 1824 as a volunteer on his father's ship .

Maritime career 

Mends passed his lieutenant's exam on 1 April 1834. He served as mate from around 1840 of the steam paddle-driven  , which was under the command of Lieutenant-Commander John Lunn, in the Mediterranean. In October 1844, he was appointed senior to the brig , of 12 guns, Captain Richard Borough Crawford, which was attached to the force at the Cape of Good Hope, and from there on 17 October appointed, in a similar capacity, his first lieutenant on HMS Eurydice, 22, Captain Talavera Vernon Anson. Mend's agents were Messrs. Ommanney of Portsmouth. On 25 July 1850 he became first lieutenant in the 120-gun  at Sheerness under Montagu Stopford. In July 1851 Mends sailed in her for the Mediterranean (Stopford was later relieved by Henry Francis Greville), until 11 January 1854, when he was promoted Commander. From 23 January that year Mends was second-in-command to Captain George Elliot on the 91-gun  at Portsmouth, and served on her in the Baltic campaign of the Crimean War (1854–55). Next, on 1 May 1858 he assumed command of a wood screw-gunboat  in the East Indies and China; he was promoted to Captain on 20 December 1858. From December 1861 Mends was appointed to the North American and West Indies stations. Mends remained on Edgar until the ship was paid off at Portsmouth. On 24 March 1866 Mends went on the retired captains list. At the time of his death he was on half pay, as he had been for several years.

Art career
Sketches and watercolours by Mends survive from as early as 1838 and as late as 1865. Over 80 of these works are in the collection of the National Maritime Museum, more than half of which are from a sketchbook that covers the period of 1850 to 1853, immediately before and during his time on HMS Trafalgar, with some examples in private hands. The lithographer and artist Thomas Goldsworthy Dutton used some of his work, and other notable artists also copied it.

Death 
Mends died of heart disease, which he had been suffering from for some time, on 15 September 1871, at his home in Seaton Terrace, off Mutley Plain, in Plymouth. He was 56 years old when he died, though obituaries at the time variously gave his age as "in his sixtieth year" and "about 60 years".

He had married Louise Wilcocks from Exeter, while on leave from HMS Trafalgar on 10 July 1851. His daughter Mary Louise, an only child, married Captain Arnold John Errington RN in Exeter on 1 May 1877.

Gallery

References

External links 

British marine artists
British war artists
1815 births
1871 deaths
People from Haverfordwest